This is a list of films based on arts books.

Architecture

Architects

Circus

Performers

 α Animated film.

Carnies

Dance

Dancers

Fine art

Painters

Sculptors

Life models

 * TV movie.

Literature

Authors (fiction)

 * TV movie.

Authors (non-fiction)

 ♠ Certain authors have written well-known fiction, in addition to their non-fiction.
 † Dramatized documentary.

Authors (ghostwriting)

 * TV movie.

Authors (forgery)

Playwrights

Poets

Scriptwriters
(radio drama)

Publishers
(books and magazines)

Readers

Bibliophiles

Magic

Magicians

Music

Composers

Conductors

Songwriters

Singers

Instrumentalists

Radio

Performers

Stage

Burlesque

Cabaret

Theatre

Actors and actresses

Stage directors

Visual arts

Photographers

See also
List of biographical films
List of fiction works made into feature films
List of non-fiction works made into feature films
List of films based on civics books
List of films based on crime books
List of films based on sports books
List of films based on spy books
List of films based on war books
List of films based on westerns

References

Notes

Bibliography
Lavington, Stephen. Virgin Film: Oliver Stone, Virgin Books, London, 2004.

Arts books
Lists of books